Xuangang Township is a township in Mangshi, Yunnan, China.  
The town is bordered to the north by Mangshi Town and Longshan Town, to the east by Fengping Town and Mangshi Town, to the south by Santaishan Township and Fengping Town, and to the west by Wuchalu Township and Jiangdong Township.

Administrative division
As of December 2015, the township is divided into five villages and one community: 
 Zhexiang Overseas Chinese Community
 Mangguang
 Bingmao
 Mangbang
 Yunzhuyuan
 Qincaitang

History
After the establishment of the Communist State in 1953, Xuangang District was set up.

It was renamed "Tuanjie Commune" in 1958 and "Xuangang Commune" in 1971.

In 1988 it was upgraded to a township.

Geography

The Mangshi River flows through  the town.

Economy
The township is rich in silica and iron ore.

Education
 Xuangang Township Central Primary School

Transport
The Provincial Highway S318 passes across the township.

References

Divisions of Mangshi